Ambulyx phalaris is a species of moth of the  family Sphingidae. It is known from Papua New Guinea.

References

Ambulyx
Moths described in 1919
Moths of New Guinea